Inadequate People is a 2010 Russian romantic comedy-drama film directed by Roman Karimov, starring Ilya Lyubimov and Ingrid Olerinskaya.

Plot
Thirty year-old man Vitaly tries to get away from worrying problems and mental discomfort by leaving the provincial town of Serpukhov and moving to Moscow, hoping to find internal harmony.

Cast 
 Ilya Lyubimov as Vitaly
 Ingrid Olerinskaya as Kristina
 Yevgeny Tsyganov as Psychologist

Awards 
  (2010)
 Grand Prix Film Festival
Diploma of Russian Guild of Film Critics
Diploma - for the actor's duet (Ingrid Olerinskaya and Ilya Lyubimov)
Golden Boat   Prize  
Prize for the best screenplay from the Union of Journalists

References

External links 

2010 romantic comedy-drama films
2010 films
Russian romantic comedy-drama films
2010 directorial debut films
Films directed by Roman Karimov
2010s Russian-language films